The 1935 Western Reserve Red Cats football team represented Western Reserve University, now known as Case Western Reserve University, during the 1935 college football season. The team was led by first-year head coach Bill Edwards., who was assisted by Cyril Surington and George Brown. Notable players included Frank "Doc" Kelker, Ray Zeh, George "Puck" Burgeon, Gene Myslenski, and Phil Ragazzo.  The Red Cats went undefeated while at home.

Ray Zeh led college football in scoring during the 1935 season with 112 points.

Schedule

References

Western Reserve
Case Western Reserve Spartans football seasons
College football undefeated seasons
Western Reserve Red Cats football